Simon Vaughn Thomas (born 21 July 1984) is an English footballer who plays as a striker.

Career
Thomas spent two years at Boreham Wood, helping them to avoid relegation. Following this he turned professional, signing with Crystal Palace for a small fee. During his first season at Palace, Thomas moved to Conference National side Grays Athletic on loan, and scored the equaliser in the 1–1 home draw against Weymouth. In February 2009, Thomas moved to Rotherham United on a one-month loan deal. The following season began with a loan spell back in the Conference, this time at Ebbsfleet United, where he scored a late winner at Eastbourne Borough.

On 16 October 2009, he joined Darlington on a three-month loan deal, making his debut on 17 October and scoring a goal in a 2–1 home win against Shrewsbury Town. He was released from Crystal Palace in early January 2010, and signed for Isthmian League Premier Division club Billericay Town on 21 January. On 3 February 2010, Thomas played for Colchester United Reserves in a game which he scored two goals in a 5–1 win against Southend United Reserves.

Thomas rejoined Grays Athletic in the Isthmian League Division One North at the start of the 2010–11 season. He made 35 appearances scoring 12 goals for Grays, before being released on 8 April 2011. He went on to join Chesham United in July 2011, ahead of the 2011–12 season and scored 43 goals in 92 matches for the Generals  before moving to Canvey Island ahead of the 2013–14 season.

He subsequently played for St Neots Town (2013–2014), Chesham United (2014–2015), St Neots Town again (2015), Needham Market (2015),  Tonbridge Angels (2015–2016), Royston Town (2016) and VCD Athletic (2016) before returning to Royston Town  and then Canvey Island.

References

External links

Simon Thomas at Footballdatabase

1984 births
Living people
English footballers
Aveley F.C. players
Thurrock F.C. players
Wivenhoe Town F.C. players
Redbridge F.C. players
Boreham Wood F.C. players
Crystal Palace F.C. players
Grays Athletic F.C. players
Rotherham United F.C. players
Ebbsfleet United F.C. players
Darlington F.C. players
Billericay Town F.C. players
Chesham United F.C. players
Canvey Island F.C. players
St Neots Town F.C. players
Needham Market F.C. players
Tonbridge Angels F.C. players
Royston Town F.C. players
VCD Athletic F.C. players
Enfield Town F.C. players
English Football League players
National League (English football) players
Isthmian League players
Black British sportsmen
Association football forwards